Aliens from Analog is the seventh in a series of anthologies of science fiction stories drawn from Analog magazine and edited by then-current Analog editor Stanley Schmidt. It was first published in paperback by Davis Publications and hardcover by The Dial Press in 1983.

The book collects eleven short stories, novelettes and novellas first published in Analog and its predecessor title Astounding, together with an introduction by Schmidt.

Contents
"Introduction" (Stanley Schmidt)
"First Contact" (Murray Leinster)
"Green-Eyed Lady" (Alison Tellure)
"The Children's Hour" (Lawrence O'Donnell (Henry Kuttner and C. L. Moore))
"... And Comfort to the Enemy" (Stanley Schmidt)
"Now Inhale" (Eric Frank Russell)
"Unhuman Sacrifice" (Katherine MacLean)
"Big Sword" (Paul Ash)
"Wings of Victory" (Poul Anderson)
"The Waveries" (Fredric Brown)
"Hobbyist" (Eric Frank Russell)
"Petals of Rose" (Marc Stiegler)

Notes

1983 anthologies
Science fiction anthologies
Stanley Schmidt anthologies
Davis Publications books